The team dressage at the 1952 Summer Olympics took place between 28 and 29 July at the Ruskeasuo Equestrian Hall. The event was open to women for the first time; of the 24 riders, 2 were female—including one member of the bronze medalist German team, Ida von Nagel.

Competition format
The team and individual dressage competitions used the same results. Competitors were given 15 minutes to complete their corresponding tests. For each second over the 15-minute mark, contestants lost half a point. Each team was ranked according to the total scores from their three members.

Results

References

External links
Official Olympic Report, la84.org.

Equestrian at the 1952 Summer Olympics